Pescopennataro is a comune (municipality) in the Province of Isernia in the Italian region Molise, located about  northwest of Campobasso and about  north of Isernia.

Pescopennataro borders the following municipalities: Agnone, Borrello, Capracotta, Rosello, Sant'Angelo del Pesco.

References

Cities and towns in Molise